Deniz Akkaya (born 3 August 1977) is a Turkish top model, presenter, occasional fashion editor and disc jockey, entrepreneur, businesswoman, and actress who won Best Model of Turkey 1997. As the top-earning model in Turkey in the early 2000s, Deniz Akkaya is considered to be one of the most leading models in Turkish fashion history, and one of the most beautiful women of the country.

Early life and family
Deniz Akkaya was born on 3 August 1977 in Istanbul, Turkey. She is Circassian, as the daughter of an Hatuqwai father and a Kabardian mother named Dinemyis (Adyghe: Apple of the eye).

Her father was a bureaucrat and master mariner who served as the CEO (managing director) of Turkish Maritime Facilities Inc. Her mother was an economist who worked for Turkish Airlines, the national flag carrier of Turkey. She studied American philology.

After graduating from the ISTEK SS Private High School on the Avenue in Kadıköy, she studied American Culture and Literature in Department of Western Languages and Literatures of Faculty of Letters at Istanbul University. Following the competitions Elite Model Look and Best Model of Turkey, she decided to embark on a professional modelling career.

Modelling career and fashion
In 2006, Akkaya became the host and lead judge of the fashion-themed reality television show Turkey's Next Top Model, the Turkish counterpart of the Top Model franchise that was hosted by many supermodels, including Tyra Banks in the United States and Heidi Klum in Germany.

In 2015, she was also entered in the Best of the Best as one of the Habertürk'''s top 20 winners of the Best Model of Turkey competition, and finished first amongst the former female titleholders who found entry in the large-scale survey that lasted for fifteen days.

Acting career
After being crowned Best Model of Turkey 1997, Akkaya decided to embark on a professional modelling career. As a film and television actress, she has acted in the films The Masked Gang: Cyprus (2007), Living & Dying (2007), School (2003), Vizontele Tuuba (2003), and Green Light (2002) in addition to the television series Hemşehrim (1996), Şarkılar Seni Söyler (2003), and Metro Palas'' (2004). She also served as editor for a fashion magazine and launched the children's luxury ready-to-wear store Chic Frog by Deniz Akkaya.

Personal life
In 2009, she gave birth to her daughter in Miami, Florida, US.

Filmography

Film

Television

References

External links
 
 

1977 births
20th-century Turkish actresses
21st-century Turkish actresses
Actresses from Istanbul
Best Model of the World contestants
Best Model of Turkey winners
Turkish businesspeople in fashion
Fashion editors
Women DJs
Living people
People from Kayseri
Retail company founders
Turkish bloggers
Turkish female models
Turkish people of Circassian descent
21st-century women musicians
Women magazine editors
Turkish women editors
Turkish women bloggers